Artyom Gennadyevich Bogucharsky (Russian: Артем Генна́дьевич Богучарский; born 14 August 1989) is a Russian stage, film and television actor who is perhaps best recalled internationally for his role in the 2002 drama, Lilya 4-ever.

Career
Born in Moscow in 1989, he garnered his first role at age 12 as the doomed Volodya, the young friend of an abandoned teenage girl in the 2002 Lukas Moodysson-directed drama Lilya 4-ever. The film received positive reviews. It won five Guldbagge Awards including Best Film and Bogucharsky was nominated as Best Actor. It was nominated for Best Film and Best Actress at the European Film Awards. The film also won several awards from film festivals around the world, including Best Film at the Gijón International Film Festival and the Rouen Nordic Film Festival.

Following his role in Lilya 4-ever, Bogucharsky went on to appear in a number of Russian films and television series. He graduated from the Gnessin State Musical College as a clarinet player. After graduating from the M.S. Schepkin Higher Theatre School in Moscow in 2009, he began appearing in a number of stage roles.

Selected filmography

References

External links

1989 births
Living people
Russian male child actors
Russian male film actors
Russian male television actors
Russian male stage actors
Male actors from Moscow
21st-century Russian male actors